The Jianshanpi Jiangnan Resort is a tourist attraction resort in Xushan Village, Liouying District, Tainan, Taiwan.

History
The resort area was originally a 21-hectare reservoir operated by Taiwan Sugar Corporation. Due to persistent problem it has been facing on accumulating deposit, it was turned into a tourist resort.

Architecture
The resort is located at the edge of a reservoir. The resort consists of Lake Touring Show Boat, Purple Bamboo Contemplation and Yuan Tsuei Chengsi Hall

Transportation
The resort is accessible by taxi or bus from Chiayi Station of Taiwan High Speed Rail or by Sinying Transport Company bus from Tainan Station or Xinying Station of Taiwan Railways.

See also
 List of tourist attractions in Taiwan

References

External links

  

Buildings and structures in Tainan
Resorts in Taiwan
Tourist attractions in Tainan